The 1994 Dunhill Cup was the 10th Dunhill Cup. It was a team tournament featuring 16 countries, each represented by three players. The Cup was played 6–9 October 1994 at the Old Course at St Andrews in Scotland. The sponsor was the Alfred Dunhill company. The Canadian team of Dave Barr, Rick Gibson, Ray Stewart beat the American team of Fred Couples, Tom Kite, and Curtis Strange in the final. They were the first unseeded team to win the Dunhill Cup.

Format
The Cup was a match play event played over four days. The teams were divided into four four-team groups. The top eight teams were seeded with the remaining teams randomly placed in the groups. After three rounds of round-robin play, the top team in each group advanced to a single elimination playoff.

In each team match, the three players were paired with their opponents and played 18 holes at medal match play. Matches tied at the end of 18 holes were extended to a sudden-death playoff. The tie-breaker for ties within a group was based on match record, then head-to-head.

Group play

Round one
Source:

Group 1

Group 2

Group 3

Coltart won on the first playoff hole.

Group 4

Hjertstedt won on the second playoff hole.

Round two
Source:

Group 1

Group 2

Clark won on the second playoff hole.

Group 3

Franco won on the sixth playoff hole.

Group 4

Čejka won on the second playoff hole.

Round three
Source:

Group 1

Group 2

Group 3

Group 4

Strüver won on the first playoff hole.

Standings

Playoffs
Source:

Bracket

Semi-finals

Final

Team results

Player results

References

Alfred Dunhill Cup
Dunhill Cup
Dunhill Cup
Dunhill Cup